Love Aaj Kal is a 2009 Indian Hindi-language romantic comedy-drama film directed by Imtiaz Ali starring Saif Ali Khan and Deepika Padukone with Rishi Kapoor and Giselli Monteiro in supporting roles. Neetu Singh appears in a cameo appearance (making a special comeback to films after a 25-year long hiatus). The film is directed by Imtiaz Ali and produced by Saif Ali Khan and Dinesh Vijan. The film portrays the feeling of pure love which never changes, although the perspective of realizing one's soulmate has changed over time. The film's soundtrack was composed by Pritam and Salim–Sulaiman with lyrics penned by Irshad Kamil.

Released on 31 July 2009, Love Aaj Kal grossed ₹1.19 billion worldwide, thus proving to be a commercial success at the box office, and was the second-highest grossing Hindi film of the year. Upon release, it received positive reviews for its novel story, screenplay, direction, dialogues, soundtrack, costumes, cinematography and performances of the cast.

At the 55th Filmfare Awards, Love Aaj Kal received a leading 12 nominations, including Best Film, Best Director (Ali), Best Actor (Khan) and Best Actress (Padukone), and won 2 awards – Best Lyricist (Kamil for "Aaj Din Chadheya") and Best Choreography (Bosco–Caesar for "Chor Bazaari"). 

It was remade into Telugu as Teen Maar (2011). Its spiritual successor of the same name, also directed by Ali and starring Kartik Aaryan and Sara Ali Khan, was released in 2020.

Plot 
Jai Vardhan Singh  and Meera Pandit  are a modern-day couple living in London. They are happy with each other, but do not believe in tying each other down, so when career beckons they have a mutual break-up but remain friends. Meera goes to India, while Jai stays in London, hoping to be called to San Francisco, where working at the Golden Gate Inc. is his dream job. Jai begins to date a Swiss girl named Jo, while Meera returns the feelings of her boss, Vikram Joshi. The couple believes they have moved on.

Running simultaneously, but set in the past, is the tale of Veer Singh Panesar. A great believer of love, the Sikh narrates his love story to Jai to try to convince him not to let Meera go from his life. He explains how he fell for a girl named Harleen Kaur. Jai ridicules Veer, who vowed to marry Harleen before he had even gotten to talk to her. But, on Veer's insistence, he agrees to pay Meera a surprise visit in India. Meera is stunned, and the two lie to both Jo and Vikram to spend time with each other. They realize how much they still like each other's company. Jai and Jo break up as Jai is unable to reciprocate the deeper feelings that Jo longs for. On the day Jai is to leave, Vikram proposes to Meera. She meets Jai secretly, who tells her she should make a decision. Angry, Meera tells him to leave her life or else she will never be able to really move on. Parallel to this, we find that Harleen has told Veer she was engaged without being told, and he must leave her.

Jai is called to his dream job in San Francisco the same day that Meera realizes her marriage is a mistake. She tells Vikram the truth and calls Jai, but he tells her about Golden Gate. Realizing he is going to San Francisco, she tells him nothing. Meanwhile, Veer declares his intentions of marrying Harleen but is badly beaten by her family.

Jai begins to lose interest in his "dream job", finding that he is not as happy as he thought he would be. He is beaten by some thugs when, while being mugged, he refuses to give them a picture of Meera. He then realizes he still loves her, and goes back to India. He finds Vikram, who informs him that Meera left him. In the past, Veer travels to Harleen's house on the day of her wedding, and convinces her mother that Harleen can only be happy with him. Harleen's mother lets Veer secretly sneak out with her daughter, and the two marry happily. In the present, Jai and Meera have a heart-touching reunion.

Cast 

 Saif Ali Khan in a dual role as
Jai Vardhan Singh, Meera's boyfriend
Veer Singh Panesar, Harleen's boyfriend
Rishi Kapoor as Older Veer Panesar
 Deepika Padukone as Meera Pandit, Jai's girlfriend and Vikram's wife
 Giselli Monteiro as Harleen Kaur, Veer's girlfriend (voice dubbed by Mona Ghosh Shetty)
Neetu Singh as Older Harleen (special appearance)
 Vir Das as Shonty
 Raj Zutshi as Vinod Singh, Harleen's father
 Rahul Khanna as Vikram Joshi, Meera's husband
 Florence Brudenell-Bruce as Jo
 Kavi Shastri as Jaat
 Sagar Arya as Jai's friend
 Mandi Sidhu as Colly
 Sheena Bhattessa as Neha Singh, Jai's sister
 Dolly Ahluwalia as Mrs. Neha Kaur, Harleen's grandmother
 Rajiv Nema as Bangladeshi taxi driver
 Amanda Rosario as Amanda
 Himanshu Solanki
 Ajay Kalyan Singh as Guy at church

Production 
The shooting of the film started in May 2008 and took place at the railway station of Patiala, Red Fort, Purana Qila and on the streets of Delhi. Parts were shot in London, San Francisco, and Kolkata. The building used as Golden Gate, Inc., in the film is actually the rotunda of San Jose City Hall. The film was not given a title until January 2009, after shooting was complete.

Release

Marketing 
The producers of the film agreed to market tie-ups with 2009 ICC World Twenty20, Shoppers Stop and Bajaj Allianz Life Insurance. The apparel worn by the lead cast is exclusively available at Shoppers Stop. With Bajaj Allianz, they have a tie-up to share the special moments where they could win a chance to meet Saif Ali Khan, the protagonist and the producer of the movie. The tie-up with the 2009 ICC World Twenty20 was that both Khan and Padukone would be in England before the tournament begins, with Saif expected to commentate on matches for Indian television. The world television premiere of Love Aaj Kal occurred on Sony TV in 2010.

Reception

Critical reception 
Love Aaj Kal received mostly positive reviews upon release, with praise for its novel screenplay, direction, dialogues, soundtrack, humor, costumes, cinematography and performances of the cast. Taran Adarsh of Bollywood Hungama gave the film 4 stars out of 5 saying, "On the whole, Love Aaj Kal is for the young and romantic at heart. Sure, it's not perfect, but the terrific performances, melodious music and stirring emotional moments more than compensate for the hiccups." Nikhat Kazmi of Times of India gave the movie 4 stars in a scale of 5, concluding that "Go watch it for its GenNow feel and its ekdum [sic] modern appeal." Sonia Chopra of Sify gave the movie 3.5 stars out of 5, commenting that "With lilting music and characters you'll love, Imtiaz Ali, brings out one of the most romantic films in recent times. It's a love story of the aam junta, with a delicious contemporary edge. Go get your fill." Shubhra Gupta of Indian Express gave the movie 3 stars in a scale of 5, noting that "It's hard not to warm up to a film which is, at its core, likable. I just wish I could have liked it more." Aniruddha Guha of DNA India gave the film 3 stars out of 5, writing that "Though Love Aaj Kal may not quite be the film you expect it to be, it does not leave you feeling disappointed either. Watch it without too many expectations and you will come back smiling. And if you have wanted to ask someone out for a while, this film is the perfect ice-breaker." Raja Sen of Rediff gave the movie 2.5 stars in a scale of 5, stating that "Love Aaj Kal is a harmless, watchable film – sad because it could have been truly special. It has its moments in the first half, while the second half is an over-melodramatic drag." Rajeev Masand of CNN-IBN gave the movie 2 stars out of 5, pointing that "The film, in the end, is ordinary stuff, watchable but never memorable like the director's previous efforts, the far-superior Socha Na Tha (2005) and Jab We Met (2007). I'm going with two out of five and an average rating for Love Aaj Kal. It's like that plump mango you bite into only to discover it's not ripe yet. Watch it nevertheless for the sharp dialogue and some clever humor."

Box office 
Love Aaj Kal netted  in India. It was declared a hit by Box Office India, grossing . The film grossed ₹1.19 billion worldwide and was one of the highest grossing films of the year.

Soundtrack 

The soundtrack of Love Aaj Kal was composed by Pritam and Salim–Sulaiman, with the former composing songs and latter the score. The lyrics for songs were penned by Irshad Kamil, and the remixes created by DJ Sanj. The song "Twist" samples "Man Dole", composed by Hemant Kumar for Nagin (1954). The album earned Pritam his first IIFA Award for Best Music Director, in addition to a nomination for the Filmfare Award for Best Music Director.

Pritam revealed in a 2014 interview that Imtiaz Ali wanted A. R. Rahman to compose the music of the film, but the latter was available only for his next, Rockstar (2011).

Awards and nominations

Remakes 
The movie was remade in Tollywood in 2011 by the name Teen Maar starring Pawan Kalyan, Trisha Krishnan, and Kriti Kharbanda.

A spiritual successor of the same name, also directed by Ali, was released in 2020, starring Kartik Aaryan and Sara Ali Khan.

Notes

References

External links 

 
 
 
 Love Aaj Kal on Bollywood Hungama

2009 films
2000s Hindi-language films
2009 romantic drama films
Hindi-language drama films
Films directed by Imtiaz Ali
Indian romantic drama films
Films shot in England
Films shot in San Francisco
Films shot in Delhi
Films shot in Kolkata
Films featuring songs by Pritam
Films shot in Mandawa
Hindi films remade in other languages